John Joseph McCormick, Jr. (May 26, 1937 – November 12, 2013) was a professional American football player who played quarterback and punter for the Minnesota Vikings and Denver Broncos from 1962-1968.

McCormick died in Lakewood, Colorado on November 12, 2013.

References

1937 births
2013 deaths
Players of American football from Boston
American football quarterbacks
American football punters
UMass Minutemen football players
Denver Broncos (AFL) players
Minnesota Vikings players